Jenn Champion, formerly known as Jenn Ghetto, is an American singer-songwriter and guitarist who performs under the name S. She was a member of the now defunct band Carissa's Wierd.

Early life
Champion grew up in Tucson, Arizona where, in the mid 1990s, she worked selling pizza with future bandmates Ben Bridwell and Mat Brooke. In 1997 the trio moved to Olympia, Washington for a year before moving to Seattle. She identifies as a lesbian and has done so since very early in her career.

Carissa's Wierd
In Seattle, Champion and Brooke formed Carissa's Wierd, who released three studio albums, the first two on Bridwell's Brown Records label. The band broke up in 2003 and since then three compilation albums have been released. Carissa's Wierd reformed for a one off show in Seattle on July 9, 2010 to promote their "best of" album, They'll Only Miss You When You Leave: Songs 1996-2003, which was released by Hardly Art Records on July 13, 2010.

In July 2010, Mat Brooke announced that he and Champion had bought the rights to Carissa's Wierd's back catalogue from Sad Robot Records. He said, "Me and Jenn have been working for a while to buy back the rights to all of our records and we finally were able to get them all back." This should allow all of Carissa's Wierd's albums to be re-released soon.

S

Champion has recorded four solo albums under the name S. Her songs are usually recorded in her bedroom and feature only vocals and guitar. 2010's I'm Not As Good At It As You featured eleven songs recorded on an 8 track machine between 2006 and 2008, along with "Wait", the album's opening track, which features her former Carissa's Wierd bandmates Mat Brooke (ukulele & banjo) and Sarah Standard (violin). Champion's most recent album, Cool Choices, was produced by former Death Cab For Cutie guitarist Chris Walla and was released on Hardly Art Records in September 2014.

From "Ghetto" to "Champion"
On September 8, 2015, Champion released the following statement on her band's official Facebook page, explaining that she would no longer use, "Ghetto" as her moniker: 
"Okay so I am changing my name, it's time for me to stop using 'Ghetto.'  I chose that as my name when I was a teenager and I realize now that it is not my place to be using it.  As I move forward, I want to acknowledge the anti-black racism i perpetuate using the word 'ghetto' and deeply apologize to those that have been hurt by my use of that word.
I am changing all internets and other things related to me that I have used the word 'ghetto' in. Unfortunately i am not financially able to repress records that I made under the name Jenn Ghetto. This is part of a process I am in of educating myself and challenging systemic oppression that I will continue to do! All the love, jenn t. champion"

Discography

Solo albums (recorded under the name "S" or Jenn Champion) 
 Sadstyle - Brown Records (2001)
 Puking and Crying - Suicide Squeeze Records (2004)
 I'm Not as Good At It As You - Own Records (2010)
 Cool Choices - Hardly Art (2014)
 Single Rider - Hardly Art (2018)

With Carissa's Wierd 
 Ugly But Honest: 1996-1999 - Brown Records (1999)
 You Should Be at Home Here - Brown Records (2001)
 Songs About Leaving - Sad Robot Records (2002)
 Scrapbook (2003)
 I Before E - Sad Robot Records (2004)
 They'll Only Miss You When You Leave: Songs 1996-2003 - Hardly Art (2010)

References

External links

Suicide Squeeze Records

Hardly Art artists
Suicide Squeeze Records artists
Living people
American people of Italian descent
American women guitarists
Musicians from Tucson, Arizona
Year of birth missing (living people)
Musicians from Seattle
Lesbian singers
Lesbian songwriters
American lesbian musicians
American LGBT singers
American LGBT songwriters
LGBT people from Arizona
Guitarists from Arizona
Guitarists from Washington (state)
Carissa's Wierd members
21st-century American women writers
American lesbian writers